Stanislav Tůma (born 5 September 1948) is a Czech former wrestler who competed in the 1972 Summer Olympics.

References

External links
 

1948 births
Living people
Olympic wrestlers of Czechoslovakia
Wrestlers at the 1972 Summer Olympics
Czech male sport wrestlers